Satellite cities or satellite towns are smaller municipalities that are adjacent to a principal city which is the core of a metropolitan area. They differ from mere suburbs, subdivisions and especially bedroom communities in that they have municipal governments distinct from that of the core metropolis and employment bases sufficient to support their residential populations. Conceptually, satellite cities could be self-sufficient communities outside of their larger metropolitan areas. However, functioning as part of a metropolis, a satellite city experiences cross-commuting (that is, residents commuting out of and employees commuting into the city).

Satellite cities versus other types of settlement
Satellite cities are different from and are sometimes confused with the following related patterns of development.

Suburbs
Satellite cities differ from suburbs in that they have distinct employment bases, commutersheds, and cultural offerings from the central metropolis, as well as an independent municipal government. Satellite cities are not bedroom communities.

Edge cities

Satellite cities differ from edge cities, which are suburbs with large employment bases and cultural offerings, in that satellite cities must have a true historic downtown, a distinct independent municipal government, existed as a city prior to becoming interconnected with the larger metropolitan core, and are surrounded by a belt of rural land between themselves and the central city.

Conceptually, both satellite cities and some types of edge city could be (and once were) self-sufficient communities outside of their larger metropolitan areas, but have become interconnected due to the suburban expansion of the larger metropolis. However, while edge cities may have their own government and share many characteristics with satellite cities, they are much more physically integrated with the core city and would not exist in anything like their present form if not for the suburban expansion of their larger neighbor. Edge cities are activity nodes within a metro area, not miniature metro areas themselves.

Some satellite cities that are particularly close or well connected to their larger neighbors and/or have their own historic downtown may also qualify as the uptown variety of edge cities, but the terms are not synonymous.

Multi-polar cities
In some cases large metropolitan areas have multiple centers of close to equal importance. These multi-polar cities are often referred to as twin cities. Multi-polar cities differ from satellite cities in such cases :
satellites are clearly much less important than the larger center around which they are located, while the various nodes of multi-polar cities are close to each other in importance
satellites are separated from the larger center by a substantial belt of rural territory, while twin cities may be fully integrated in physical form

For example, Fort Worth, Texas is a twin of Dallas, Texas because though Fort Worth is somewhat smaller, it is proportionally close enough and physically integrated enough with Dallas to be considered a twin rather than a satellite.  However, Waco, Texas is a satellite town of both cities. Generally speaking, cities that are listed as being part of the same urbanized area should be considered twins, rather than one having a satellite relationship to the other.

Metropolitan areas
Conceptually, satellite cities are miniature metro areas on the fringe of larger ones. Satellite cities are sometimes listed as part of the larger metro area, and sometimes listed as totally independent. In the United States, satellite cities are often (but not always) listed as independent Metropolitan Statistical Areas within a single Combined Statistical Area that is unified with the larger metropolis.

Examples

See also
General
Rural exodus
New Urbanism
Urban sprawl
Bedroom community
Edge city
Urban area
United States urban area
Planning
Regional planning
Spatial planning

References

External articles
 Graham Romeyn Taylor, Satellite Cities. A Study of Industrial Suburbs. 
 Berger, A. S. (1978). The city: urban communities and their problems. Dubuque, Iowa: Brown.
 Carpenter, N. (1931). The sociology of city life. Longmans' social science series. New York: Longmans, Green and Co.

Urbanization
Urban studies and planning terminology
Cities by type